All India Kisan Sabha ( AIKS; lit. All India Farmers Union, also known as the Akhil Bharatiya Kisan Sabha), is the peasant or farmers' wing of the Communist Party of India, an important peasant movement formed by Sahajanand Saraswati in 1936.

History
The Kisan Sabha movement started in Bihar under the leadership of Sahajanand Saraswati who had formed in 1929 the Bihar Provincial Kisan Sabha (BPKS) in order to mobilise peasant grievances against the zamindari attacks on their occupancy rights, and thus sparking the farmers' movements in India.

Gradually the peasant movement intensified and spread across the rest of India. All these radical developments on the peasant front culminated in the formation of the All India Kisan Sabha at the Lucknow session of the Indian National Congress in April 1936, with Swami Sahajanand Saraswati elected as its first president. The other prominent members of this Sabha were N.G. Ranga, Ram Manohar Lohia, Jayaprakash Narayan, Acharya Narendra Dev and Bankim Mukerji, and it involved prominent leaders like N.G. Ranga, E.M.S. Namboodiripad, Indulal Yagnik, Sohan Singh Bhakna, Z.A. Ahmed, Pandit Karyanand Sharma, Pandit Yamuna Karjee, Pandit Yadunandan (Jadunandan) Sharma, Rahul Sankrityayan, P. Sundarayya, Ram Manohar Lohia, Yogendra Sharma and Bankim Mukherjee. The Kisan Manifesto, released in August 1936, demanded abolition of the zamindari system and cancellation of rural debts; in October 1937 it adopted the red flag as its banner. Soon, its leaders became increasingly distant with Congress and repeatedly came in confrontation with Congress governments, in Bihar and United Province.

In the subsequent years, the movement was increasingly dominated by Socialists and Communists as it moved away from the Congress. By the 1938 Haripura session of the Congress, under the presidency of Netaji Subhas Chandra Bose, the rift became evident and by May 1942, the Communist Party of India, which was finally legalised by the government in July 1942, had taken over All India Kisan Sabha all across India, including Bengal where its membership grew considerably. It took on the Communist Party's line of People's War and stayed away from the Quit India Movement which started in August 1942, though this also meant losing its popular base. Many of its members defied party orders and joined the movement. Prominent members like N.G. Ranga, Indulal Yagnik and Swami Sahajananda soon left the organisation, which increasingly found it difficult to approach the peasants without the watered-down approach of pro-British and pro-war, and increasing its pro-nationalist agenda, much to the dismay of the British Raj.

Conferences and office bearers

First conference held at Lucknow
President:Swami Sahajanand Saraswati
General secretary:N.G.Ranga
Second conference held at Faijpur on 25,26 December 1936
President: N.G.Ranga
Third conference held at Comilla now in Bangladesh on 11–14 May 1938
President:Swami Sahajanand Saraswati
Fourth conference held at Gaya, Bihar on 6–10 April 1939
President: Acharya Narendra Deo.
Swagtadhyaksh: Pandit Yadunandan Sharma
Fifth conference held at Palasa Andhra Pradesh on 26–27 March 1940 in presidency of Baba Sohanasing Bhakhna.
Pandit Rahul Sanskrityan was set as president but he was arrested before conference so Sohansing Bhakhna elected as president.
Sixth conference held in Patna on 29-30-31 May 1942.
President: Indulal Yagnik
Seventh conference held at Bhakhna, Punjab on 1–4 April 1943.
President: Bankim Mukherjee.
Eighth conference held at Vijayawada Andhra Pradesh on 14–15 March 1944
President: Sahajanand Saraswati
Ninth conference held at Netrakona now in Bangladesh on 7–9 April 1945
President: Muzaffar Ahmed
Tenth conference held at Secunderabad Aligarh on 22–26 May 1947
President: Karyanand Sharma.
Eleventh conference held at Kananoor Kerala on 22–23 April 1953
President: Indulal Yagnik
General secretary: N. Prasad Rao.
Twelfth conference held at Moga Punjab on 13–19 September 1954
President: Indulal Yagnik
General secretary:N.Prasad Rao
Thirteenth conference held at Talasari, Dahanu-Maharashtra on 17–22 May 1955
President: Com.Nana Patil
General se: N. Prasad Rao.
Fourteenth conference held at Amritsar 28–30 September 1956
President: A.K.Gopalan.
Fifteenth conference held at Bangaon West Bengal on 28 October to 3 November 1957.
Sixteenth conference held at Mayuram District Tanjaur Tamil Nadu.
Seventeenth conference held at Gazipur on 17–19 May 1960.
President:A.K.Gopalan
General secretary: Bhavani Sen.
Eighteenth conference held at Thrisoor on 30 March to 2 April 1961
President:A.K.Gopalan.
General Secretary: Kavitet Sing Layalpuri.
Nineteenth conference held at Amravati on 10–12 January 1968
President: Com.Teja Sinh Swatantra
General Secretary: Z.A. Ahmed.
Twentieth conference held at Barasat, West Bengal on 1–5 April 1970
President: Teja Sinh
General Secretary: Z.A.Ahmed
Twenty-first conference held at Bhatinda on 19–23 September 1973.
Twenty second conference held at Vijayawada Andhra Pradesh on 7–10 June 1979
President: Z.A.Ahmed
General Secretary: Indradeep Sinha
Twenty third conference held at Barabanki Uttar Pradesh on 28–31 December 1986
President: Indradeep Sinha
General Secretary:Y.V.Krishna Rao.
Twenty fourth conference held at Madhubani Bihar on 16–19 June 1993
President:Com. Y.V.Krishna Rao
General Secretary: Com. Bhogendra Jha.
Twenty fifth conference held at Bihar.
President:Com.Bhogendra Jha
General Secretary:Com. Y.V.Krishna Rao.
Twenty sixth conference held at Thrisur.
President: Com.Bhogendra Jha
General Secretary:Com. Atulkumar Anjan
Twenty seventh conference held at Kauntai West Bengal
President:Com.C.K.Chandrappan
General Secretary:Com. Atulkumar Anjaan
Twenty eighth conference held at Aurangabad Maharashtra on 10–12 December 2010
President:Com. Prabodh Panda
General Secretary:Com. Atulkumar Anjaan
Twenty ninth conference held at Hyderabad, Telanagana on 27–29 March 2015
President:Com.Prabodh Panda
Working President: Com. Bhupindar Sambar
General Secretary: Com.Atulkumar Anjaan

Activities

Protest against three Agri-bills 
AIKS led nationwide protests against Farmers' Produce Trade and Commerce (Promotion and Facilitation) Act, 2020, Farmers (Empowerment and Protection) Agreement on Price Assurance and Farm Services Act, 2020 and Essential Commodities (Amendment) Act, 2020.

2 October 2018: AIKS organized march of farmers at the Delhi-Uttar Pradesh border.
 26 January 2021: AIKS organized tractor rally in national capital.
26 February 2022: AIKS led Thousands of farmers started marching to Dhule District (Maharashtra) Collector's Office demanding forest land certificate.

References

External links
Official Facebook Page

Further reading
 
 Swami Sahajanand and the Peasants of Jharkhand: A View from 1941 translated and edited by Walter Hauser along with the unedited Hindi original (Manohar Publishers, paperback, 2005).
 Sahajanand on Agricultural Labour and the Rural Poor translated and edited by Walter Hauser Manohar Publishers, paperback, 2005).
 Religion, Politics, and the Peasants: A Memoir of India's Freedom Movement translated and edited by Walter Hauser Manohar Publishers, hardbound, 2003).
Swami And Friends: Sahajanand Saraswati And Those Who Refuse To Let The Past of Bihar's Peasant Movements Become History By Arvind Narayan Das, Paper for the Peasant Symposium, May 1997 University of Virginia, Charlottesville, Virginia
Bagchi, A.K., 1976, "Deindustrialisation in Gangetic Bihar, 1809- 1901" in Essays in Honour of Prof. S.C. Sarkar, New Delhi.
Banaji, Jairus, 1976, "The Peasantry in the Feudal Mode of Production: Towards an Economic Model", Journal of Peasant Studies, April.
Bandopadhyay, D., 1973, "Agrarian Relations in Two Bihar Districts", Mainstream, 2 June, New Delhi.
Judith M. Brown, 1972, Gandhi's Rise to Power: Indian Politics, 1915–1922, London.
Chaudhuri, B.B., 1971, "Agrarian Movements in Bengal and Bihar, 1919-1939" in B.R. Nanda, ed., Socialism in India, New Delhi.
Chaudhuri, B.B., 1975, "The Process of Depeasantisation in Bengal and Bihar, 1885-1947", Indian Historical Review, 2(1), July, New Delhi.
Chaudhuri, B.B., 1975a, "Land Market in Eastern India, 1793-1940", Indian Economic and Social History Review, 13 (1 & 2), New Delhi.
Arvind Narayan Das, 1981, Agrarian Unrest and Socio-economic Change in Bihar, 1900-1980, Delhi : Manohar.
Arvind Narayan Das (ed.),1982, Agrarian Movements in India : Studies on 20th Century Bihar, London : Frank Cass.
Arvind Narayan Das, 1992, The Republic of Bihar, New Delhi : Penguin.
Arvind Narayan Das, 1996, Changel : The Biography of a Village, New Delhi : Penguin.
Datta, K.K., 1957, History of the Freedom Movement in Bihar, Patna.
Diwakar, R.R., ed., 1957, Bihar Through the Ages, Patna.
Mohandas Karamchand Gandhi, 1921, "The Zamindar and the Ryots", Young India, Vol. III (New Series) No. 153, 18 May.
Mohandas Karamchand Gandhi, 1940, An Autobiography or The Story of My experiments in Truth, Ahmedabad.
Mishra, G., 1968. "The Socio-economic Background of Gandhi's Champaran Movement", Indian Economic and Social History Review, 5(3), New Delhi.
Mishra, G., 1978, Agrarian Problems of Permanent Settlement: A Case Study of Champaran, New Delhi.
Mitra, Manoshi, 1983, Agrarian Social Structure in Bihar: Continuity and Change, 1786–1820, Delhi : Manohar.
Pouchepadass, J., 1974, "Local Leaders and the Intelligentsia in the Champaran Satyagraha", Contributions to Indian Sociology, New Series, No.8, November, New Delhi.
Prasad, P.H., 1979, "Semi-Feudalism: Basic Constraint in Indian Agriculture" in Arvind N. Das & V. Nilakant, eds., Agrarian Relations in India, New Delhi.
Shanin, Teodor, 1978, Defining Peasants: Conceptualisations and Deconceptualisations: Old and New in a Marxist Debate, Manchester University.
Solomon, S., 1937, Bihar and Orissa in 1934-35, Patna.
 Socialism in India, by Bal Ram Nanda, Nehru Memorial Museum and Library. Published by Vikas Publications, 1972.Page 205.
 A History of the All India Kisan Sabha, by Md. Abdullah Rasul. Published by National Book Agency, 1974.
 Peasants in History: Essays in Honour of Daniel Thorner, by Eric J. Hobsbawm, Daniel Thorner, Witold Kula, Sameeksha Trust.Published by Oxford University Press, 1981.
 Bihar Peasantry and the Kisan Sabha, 1936-1947, by Rakesh Gupta. Published by People's Pub. House, 1982.
 The Constitution of All India Kisan Sabha Encyclopaedia of Political Parties, by  O. P. Ralhan, Published by Anmol Publications Pvt. Ltd., 2002. . Page 1-10.

Nonviolent resistance movements
Communist Party of India mass organisations
Organizations established in 1936
1936 establishments in India
Peasants
Organisers of 2020–2021 Indian farmers' protest